Bijolia Parshvanath Temple or Tapodaya Teerth Kshetra is a Jain pilgrimage center located in Bijolia town in Bhilwara district of Rajasthan.

History 

Bijolia is famous for two rock inscriptions, both dated 1170 CE (V. S. 1226). One inscription provides the genealogy of the Chahamanas of Shakambhari and the second is a Jaina poem called . The first inscription opens with salutation to Parshvanatha and records coronation of Somesvara. The third verse of inscription describes how Someshvara gave the grant to build Parshvanatha temple in Rewna village. The latter inscription, engraved near the door of the Parsvanatha temple, records the homage of Manoratha, son of Mahidhara. According to Jain tradition, this place is believed to be where the Uttama Sikhara Purana was composed.

According to Peter Flügel, the Undeshvar Shiva temple of Bijolia was originally a Śvētāmbara temple based on carvings of prominent Jain figures in the temple exterior.

About temple 
Five Jain temples was constructed in 1160 CE by Mahajan Lala during the reign of King Somesvara of Chahamanas empire. The main temple is a large structure consisting of a small model of the temple. The temple is dedicated to Parshvanatha and is a major Jain pilgrimage center.

Gallery

See also 
 Ahichchhatra Jain temples

References

Citations

Sources

Books

Web

External links

Jain temples in Rajasthan
12th-century Jain temples